Colombian literature, as an expression of the culture of Colombia, is heterogeneous due to the coexistence of Spanish, African and Native American heritages in an extremely diverse geography. Five distinct historical and cultural traditions can be identified, with their own socioeconomic history: the Caribbean coast, Greater Antioquia, the Cundinamarca-Boyacá Highlands, Greater Tolima and the Western Valley. Colombia produced one of the richest literatures of Latin America, as much for its abundance as for its variety and innovation during the 19th and 20th centuries. Colombian intellectuals who forged the literature of this period also contributed decisively to the consolidation of Latin American literature.

Conquest and early colonial period (1499-1810) 

Under the Spanish Empire, major literary topics included conquest narratives, chronicles, religious devotion, and love themes.  Some of the best-known authors of this period are:

 Gonzalo Jiménez de Quesada (1496 -other sources state 1506 or 1509Suesca, 16 February 1579) - First chronicler as he kept diaries of his own conquests, main conquistador of large parts of Colombia, may have been the (partial) author of Epítome de la conquista del Nuevo Reino de Granada (not published until 1889), his diaries were published in 1576
 Juan de Castellanos (Alanís, Sevilla, 9 March 1522 - Tunja, November 1606) - Wrote the longest poem ever in the Spanish language, Elegías de varones ilustres de Indias (1589)
 Pedro Simón (San Lorenzo de la Parrilla, Spain, 1574 - Ubaté, ca. 1628) - Friar who wrote Noticias historiales de las conquistas de Tierra Firme en las Indias occidentales about the Spanish conquest in 1626
 Juan Rodríguez Freyle (Bogotá, 25 April 1566 - Bogotá, 1642) - Spanish priest, wrote the extensive chronicle of the Spanish conquest of the Muisca;  El Carnero ("The Sheep"), first published in 1638
 Hernando Domínguez Camargo (Bogotá, 1606 – Tunja, 1659) - Jesuit priest and writer. His work was influenced by the Spanish poet Luis de Góngora, in a cultural trend known as the Indias Baroque. His most recognized works are "Epic Poem to St Ignacio of Loyola" and  "Bouquet of poetic flowers"
 Lucas Fernández de Piedrahita (Bogotá, 1624 — Ciudad de Panamá, 29 March 1688) - Published Historia general de las conquistas del Nuevo Reino de Granada, a major work about the Spanish conquest and the indigenous peoples of Colombia in 1676
 Francisco Álvarez de Velasco y Zorrilla (Bogotá, 1647 – Madrid, 1708) - His main work was Rhytmica Sacra, Moral y Laudatiria. His writings show admiration for the work of Francisco de Quevedo and Sor Juana Inés de la Cruz
 Francisca Josefa de Castillo y Guevara (Tunja, 1671 – Tunja, 1742) - nun, recognized as one of the most important female authors of mysticism for her Afectos espirituales and her Vida (memoirs).

Emancipation and national consolidation (1780-1830)

During the process of independence, Colombian literature was strongly influenced by the political motivations of the moment.  The main literary movements were close to Romanticism.

During the nineteenth century, political writing was led by  Simón Bolívar.  Local journalism was initiated by Antonio Nariño. The Colombian government established the first Academy of Spanish language in the American continent, in 1871.

Other relevant authors were:

Camilo Torres Tenorio
Francisco Antonio Zea.
José Fernández Madrid (February 19, 1789 – June 28, 1830).

Costumbrismo

In the late nineteenth and early twentieth centuries, the main topic in Colombian literature was the colourful depiction of peasant life, tied to strong criticism of society and government.  This type of literature was called costumbrista literature.  Some of the authors of this period are:

Tomás Carrasquilla
Adolfo León Gómez
José María Cordovez Moure
Eustaquio Palacios
Jorge Isaacs
Julio Arboleda
Gregorio Gutiérrez González
Rafael Pombo
 Soledad Acosta
Josefa Acevedo de Gomez
Candelario Obeso
Manuel Ancízar

Modern literature

Modernismo and modernism are reactions against the previous literature of Romanticism.  Modernism's main topics are ugliness and mystery.  The main modern writers are:

Emilia Ayarza
Jose Eustasio Rivera
Rafael Maya
León de Greiff
Luis Vidales
Luis Carlos López
Germán Arciniegas
Porfirio Barba-Jacob
José María Vargas Vila

Stone and Sky (Piedra y Cielo)

The industrialization process in Latin America during the twentieth century generated new literary movements such as the poetic movement named  “Piedra y cielo” (1939). Its main authors are:

Eduardo Carranza
Jorge Gaitán Durán
Jorge Rojas
Arturo Camacho Ramírez
Augusto Pinilla

Nothing-ism (Nadaísmo)

  
The violent events in Colombia during the 1940s and 1950s, such as La Violencia and the military government of Gustavo Rojas Pinilla, as well as a considerable urban expansion, influenced in the formation of the Nadaísta (Nothing-ist) movement, which was the Colombian expression of numerous avant-garde-like movements in the poetry of the Americas during the 1950s and 60s (such as the *Beat Generation in the United States and the Tzanticos in Ecuador). Nadaísmo included elements of existentialism and nihilism, a dynamic incorporation of city life, and a generally irreverent, iconoclastic flavor.  Authors who were part of this movement include:

Gonzalo Arango
Jotamario Arbeláez
Eduardo Escobar
Fanny Buitrago
Patricia Ariza
Jaime Jaramillo Escobar

The Boom

The Latin American Boom was a prolific period for Colombian literature.

Gabriel García Márquez
Eduardo Caballero Calderón
Manuel Mejía Vallejo
Álvaro Mutis
Manuel Zapata Olivella
Andres Caicedo
Alfredo Iriarte
Germán Arciniegas
Álvaro Cepeda Samudio

Contemporary authors

Disillusioned Generation / Generación Desencantada

This generation groups a broad and ambiguous list of writers, poets who began to publish after the Nadaísmo movement (see above) in the 1970s. Poets like Giovanni Quessep, Harold Alvarado Tenorio, Juan Gustavo Cobo Borda, Elkin Restrepo, José Manuel Arango, Darío Jaramillo Agudelo, Augusto Pinilla, María Mercedes Carranza, and Juan Manuel Roca among many others, have been considered part of this generation, although they have differences in style, themes and ideology.

Recent generations

Some writers like Cristian Valencia, Alberto Salcedo Ramos and Jorge Enrique Botero, have written literary journalism, close to Gonzo style. In fiction there are authors like Hector Abad Faciolince, Santiago Gamboa, Orlando Echeverri Benedetti, Juan Sebastian Cardenas, Nahum Montt, Miguel Mendoza Luna, Sebastian Pineda Buitrago, Mauricio Loza, Ignacio Arroyave Piedrhíta, Antonio Garcia, Mario Mendoza, James Canon, Ricardo Abdahllah, Juan Pablo Plata, Evelio Rosero Diago, Antonio Ungar, Laura Restrepo, Ruben Varona, William Ospina, David Alberto Campos, Oscar Perdomo Gamboa, Juan Esteban Constain, Juan Álvarez, Andrés Del Castillo, Antonio Iriarte Cadena, Esmir Garcés, Antonieta Villamil, Winston Morales, Efraim Medina Reyes, Ricardo Silva Romero and many others.

Recent poetry

In recent decades, in Colombia there has been a significant number of poets of importance, who deal with urban issues and anti-poetry. Among them are Antonieta Villamil, Andrea Cote, Lucia Estrada, Felipe García Quintero, whose poetry has been recognized internationally.

Poetry

 Emilia Ayarza
 José Asunción Silva
 Porfirio Barba-Jacob
 Piedad Bonnet
 Antonieta Villamil
 José Fernández Madrid
 Jorge Isaacs
 Rafael Pombo
 Zacarías Reyán
 Julio Flórez

Children's literature 
Some of the characters most recognized in Colombian children's literature and the popular imaginary are the stock characters created by Rafael Pombo, which are often found in nursery rhymes, familiar folk tales and in the textbooks for elementary school.

Other important children literature authors are:
 Jairo Anibal Niño: with his works "La alegria de querer" (The joy of love), "Razzgo, Indo y Zas", "Catalino Bocachica" among others
 Euclides Jaramillo: with the "Tales of Uncle rabbit"
 From the 1980s, young adult fiction authors Gloria Cecilia Díaz, Irene Vasco, Evelio José Rosero, Yolanda Reyes and Pilar Lozano introduced new subjects for the genre such as conflict, kidnapping, death and fear. 
 Recent picture book voices include the work of Ivar da Coll, Claudia Rueda, Jairo Buitrago and Rafael Yockteng

References

See also
List of Colombian writers

 
Latin American literature by country
South American literature
Spanish-language literature